Bernhard Pez (22 February 1683, at Ybbs near Melk – 27 March 1735, at Melk, Lower Austria) was an Austrian Benedictine historian and librarian.

Life
He studied at Vienna and Krems, and in 1699 entered Melk Abbey. Having studied the classical languages, he was made professor in the Melk monastery school in 1704, and in the same year went to the University of Vienna, where he studied theology. In 1708 he was ordained priest.

He took up history, and in 1713, became librarian at Melk. As a model for his historical works he followed the French Maurists. He studied the archives of the order at Melk and Vienna, and in 1715-17 he, with his brother Hieronymus Pez, searched for manuscripts in the Austrian, Bavarian, and Swabian monasteries. 

In 1716 he published a plan for a universal Benedictine library, in which all the authors of the order, and their works, should be catalogued and reviewed. He obtained from the monasteries of his order no less than seven hundred and nine titles. He also had friendly literary relations with Johann von Eckhart, Schannat, Uffenbach, Schmincke, Mosheim, Lünig etc. In 1728 he accompanied Count Sinzendorf to France, where he made the acquaintance of Montfaucon, Martène Durand, Le Texier, Calmet etc., and enriched his collection from the libraries of the order.

Works
His chief works are: 

"Thesaurus anecdotorum novissimus" (6 fol. vol., Augsburg, 1721-9), a collection of exegetic, theological, philosophical, ascetic, and historical literary sources;
"Bibliotheca ascetica" (12 vols., 1723–40), containing the sources of ascetic literature; 
"Bibliotheca Benedictino-Maruiana" (1716). 

In a controversy with the Jesuits he defended his order with the "Epistolæ apologeticæ pro Ordine S. Benedicti", 1716. In 1725 he published "Homilien des Abtes Gottfried von Admont (1165)", in two vols., and the minor philosophical works of Abbot Engelbert von Admont. 

His proposed monumental work, "Bibliotheca Benedictina Generalis", was never completed. His manuscript material is partly made use of in the "Historia rei literariæ O.S.B." by Ziegelbauer-Legipont (1754). His manuscripts were preserved at Melk.

References

Attribution

1683 births
1735 deaths
Austrian Benedictines